Martin Legassick (1940–2016) was a South African historian and Marxist activist. He died on 1 March 2016 after a battle with cancer. He was one of the central figures in the "revisionist" school of South African historiography that, drawing on Marxism, revolutionised the study of the social formation of Apartheid by highlighting the importance of political economy, class contradictions and imperialism. He was also a key figure in the independent left in South Africa from the 1970s, and a critic, from the left, of many of the analytical and strategic positions taken by the African National Congress and the South African Communist Party, as well as their understanding of South African history.  The author of numerous books, mainly on the history of colonialism and capitalism, he collected many of his key political writings in his 2007 book Towards Socialist Democracy.

Early life
Legassick was born in Edinburgh, Scotland. In 1947 he and his parents emigrated to South Africa. He attended the Diocesan College in Cape Town. In 1960 he became a Rhodes Scholar at Balliol College, Oxford. He later completed his PhD at the University of California. He then worked at universities in the United Kingdom and Tanzania, where he became active in the ANC and the South African Congress of Trade Unions (SACTU) in exile. Together with Giovanni Arrighi, John S. Saul and others he developed an influential politico-economic analysis focusing on the contradictions engendered by the proletarianisation and dispossession of the Southern African peasantry. According to Arrighi, "Martin Legassick and Harold Wolpe...maintained that South African Apartheid was primarily because the regime had to become more repressive of the African labour force because it was fully proletarianized, and could no longer subsidize capital accumulation as it had done in the past."

Student activism
In the 1970s, Legassick became involved in the independent left. In 1979, together with Paula Ensor, Dave Hemson and Rob Petersen, he was suspended from the African National Congress for allegedly forming a faction. They were involved in the exiled African National Congress. They regarded their suspension as undemocratic and launched the Marxist Workers Tendency of the ANC. Legassick left academia in 1981 to become a full-time anti-apartheid activist, arguing for the transformation of the African National Congress into a revolutionary working class movement, and a socialist solution to South Africa's national and social questions. He was on the editorial committee of the MWT journal, Inqaba yaBasebenzi, and the MWT newspaper, Congress Militant. He was expelled by the ANC in 1985.

Academia
After the unbanning of the ANC in 1990 he was able to return home to Cape Town where he returned to academia. However, he continued to play a leading role in the MWT of the ANC and was active in working class struggles in the Western Cape. The Marxist Workers' Tendency was affiliated to the Committee for a Workers' International, an international organisation of Trotskyist parties and the newspaper, The Militant. Legassick was expelled from the ANC in 1985.

Legassick later became a prominent activist working with a variety of groups in Cape Town including the Western Cape Anti-Eviction Campaign in the 2000s, with Abahlali baseMjondolo, with the Mandela Park Backyarders and, more recently, in the Democratic Left Front. In 2007 he was involved in an exchange of open letters with the then National Minister of Housing in South Africa, Lindiwe Sisulu. In May 2009 he was arrested while supporting the Macassar Village Land Occupation near Cape Town.

A dominant and consistent theme in Legassick's political work is the building of "a mass workers' party". The Workers and Socialist Party is a South African political party from the MWT tradition, that takes Legassick's work as an important reference point.

Publications

References

Further reading

The Making of the South African Past, Christopher Saunders, 1988

External links
 The African Activist Archive Project website includes material a description of and material of the South Africa Freedom Action Committee of which Martin Legassick was a founder.

1940 births
2016 deaths
Housing in South Africa
Members of the African National Congress
South African academics
South African activists
South African Trotskyists
L
South African Marxists